The Criminal Justice Information Services Division (or CJIS) is a division of the United States Federal Bureau of Investigation (FBI) located in Clarksburg, Harrison County, West Virginia. The CJIS was established in February 1992 and is the largest division in the FBI.

According to the FBI, the CJIS is a high-tech hub providing state-of-the-art tools and services to law enforcement, national security/intelligence community partners, and the general public.

CJIS Overview 

The CJIS Division is the largest division of the FBI Science and Technology Branch and is located in a half million square foot main facility on a 986-acre (4.0 km²) tract in Clarksburg, West Virginia. CJIS services located at this site include the National Crime Information Center (NCIC), Integrated Automated Fingerprint Identification System (IAFIS), LEO Enterprise Portal (LEO-EP), National Instant Criminal Background Check System (NICS), Uniform Crime Reporting (UCR), and the Law Enforcement National Data Exchange (N-DEx).

The mission of CJIS is to reduce terrorist and criminal activities by maximizing the ability to provide timely and relevant criminal justice information to the FBI and to qualified law enforcement, criminal justice, civilian, academic, employment, and licensing agencies concerning individuals, stolen property, criminal organizations/activities, and other law enforcement-related data.

Here statisticians compile vast amounts of data from law enforcement into a series of regular reports detailing the state of crime in communities across the country.

See also
Integrated Automated Fingerprint Identification System (IAFIS)
National Incident-Based Reporting System (NIBRS)

Notes

External links 
 

Government agencies established in 1992
Criminology organizations
Criminal investigation
Forensics organizations
Clarksburg, West Virginia
Criminal records
Government databases in the United States
Law enforcement databases in the United States